Mutamba Makenga (born 17 November 1975) is a Congolese footballer who played as a defender. He played in eleven matches for the DR Congo national team from 1997 to 1999. He was also named in the DR Congo's squad for the 1998 African Cup of Nations tournament.

References

External links
 

1975 births
Living people
Democratic Republic of the Congo footballers
Association football defenders
Democratic Republic of the Congo international footballers
1998 African Cup of Nations players
Place of birth missing (living people)